Chinchon or Chinchón can refer to:

 Chinchón, a town in Spain
 Castle of Chinchón, a castle in Spain
 Anisette, also called "Chinchón dulce"
 Chinchón (card game)
 Chinchun, also spelled Chinchón, a mountain in Peru

See also
 Count of Chinchón
 Countess of Chinchón